Document is the fifth studio album by American rock band R.E.M., released on August 31, 1987, by I.R.S. Records. It was the first album by the band to be produced by Scott Litt.

Continuing in the vein of their previous album Lifes Rich Pageant, Document features more audible lyrics and a harder rock sound in comparison to the band's earlier releases. The album became R.E.M.'s greatest success at the time, giving the band their first top 10 hit ("The One I Love") and album, peaking at number 10 on the Billboard 200.

Composition

Document was R.E.M.'s first album to be co-produced both by the band and Scott Litt; this was a collaboration that continued through the productions of Green, Out of Time, Automatic for the People, Monster, and New Adventures in Hi-Fi. The album's clear production and muscular rock riffs both helped to move the band toward mainstream success and built on the work done by Don Gehman, who had produced their previous album Lifes Rich Pageant.  This release not only launched "The One I Love" — R.E.M.'s first Top 10 hit on the Billboard Hot 100 at number 9 — but also gave them their first platinum album.

"Strange" was originally recorded by post-punk band Wire on their debut album Pink Flag.

R.E.M. expanded their instrumentation somewhat on the album, adding a dulcimer to "King of Birds" and a saxophone to "Fireplace". Steve Berlin was brought in to add his saxophone skills because of a prior relationship with producer Scott Litt. This experimentation would lead to their adoption of the mandolin, which featured prominently on their subsequent albums Green and Out of Time; furthermore, the band's musicians began swapping instruments both in concert and the studio with an effort to create new sounds and avoid stagnation.

Packaging
The original sleeve for the album featured the message "File under Fire", a reference to what Michael Stipe considered to be the central lyrical theme of the album, and also references the chorus to "The One I Love". A similar message ("File under water") could be found on the cover of the band's second album, Reckoning, as well as on the compilation album Eponymous ("File under grain") referring to the idea behind "Talk About the Passion", which was about hunger. Two rejected suggestions for the title of the album—R.E.M. No. 5 and Table of Content—also appear on the sleeve artwork. Other possible album titles included Mr. Evil Breakfast, Skin Up with R.E.M., and Last Train to Disneyland (the last one having been suggested by Peter Buck, who felt that America under the presidency of Ronald Reagan was beginning to feel a lot like the famed amusement park).

Critical reception

In a contemporary review for The Village Voice, Robert Christgau said the band had moved on from their past work's escapism and that "their discovery of the outside world has sharpened their sense of humor along with everything else", citing "It's the End of the World as We Know It (And I Feel Fine)" as an "inspirational title". Rolling Stone reviewer David Fricke felt that the album was R.E.M.'s "finest to date", and said that "Document is the sound of R.E.M. on the move".

Stephen Thomas Erlewine of AllMusic said that "where Lifes Rich Pageant sounded a bit like a party record, Document is a fiery statement, and its memorable melodies and riffs are made all the more indelible by its righteous anger." Rolling Stone went on to include the album in their list of the 100 greatest albums of the 1980s (in 41st place), and then ranked it number 462 on 2012 list of the 500 Greatest Albums of All Time. In 2012, Slant Magazine listed the album at number 17 on its list of "Best Albums of the 1980s".

Reissue
In 1999, the album was remastered by Bob Ludwig and re-released on Compact Disc by I.R.S. Records in the United States. This version came in a replica of the record sleeve made of cardboard. In 2005, Capitol Records (whose then parent company EMI at that time owned I.R.S. Records' catalog) issued an expanded DualDisc edition of Document which includes a digitally remastered version of the album on the CD side, a DVD-Audio, DTS and Dolby Digital 5.1-channel surround sound mix of the album done by Elliot Scheiner on the DVD side, and the original CD booklet.

Track listing
All songs were written by Bill Berry, Peter Buck, Mike Mills and Michael Stipe, except where noted.

Side one – "Page side"
"Finest Worksong" – 3:48
"Welcome to the Occupation" – 2:46
"Exhuming McCarthy" – 3:19
"Disturbance at the Heron House" – 3:32
"Strange" (Bruce Gilbert, Graham Lewis, Colin Newman, Robert Grey) – 2:31
"It's the End of the World as We Know It (And I Feel Fine)" – 4:05

Side two – "Leaf side"
"The One I Love" – 3:17
"Fireplace" – 3:22
"Lightnin' Hopkins" – 3:20
"King of Birds" – 4:09
"Oddfellows Local 151" – 5:21

1993 I.R.S. Vintage Years reissue bonus tracks
"Finest Worksong (Other Mix)" – 3:47
B-side of "Finest Worksong" 12" single
"Last Date" (Floyd Cramer) – 2:16
B-side of "The One I Love" American 12" single and "It's the End of the World as We Know It (And I Feel Fine)" American 7" single
"The One I Love" (Live at McCabe's Guitar Shop) – 4:06
B-side of "The One I Love" American 12" single and "It's the End of the World as We Know It (And I Feel Fine)" British 7" and 12" singles
 "Time After Time, Etc." (Live) – 8:22
B-side of "Finest Worksong" 7 & 12 Inch & "It's the End of the World as We Know It (And I Feel Fine)" 12 Inch UK
"Disturbance at the Heron House" (Live at McCabe's Guitar Shop) – 3:26
B-side of "The One I Love" British 12" single
"Finest Worksong" (Lengthy Club Mix) – 5:52
B-side of "Finest Worksong" 12" single

Note
Although sometimes referred to as such, the first release of this edition does not have the original tracks remastered. They follow the first print of the album and only add the extra tracks.

25th anniversary bonus disc, recorded live at Muziekcentrum Vredenburg in Utrecht, Netherlands, September 14, 1987
"Finest Worksong" – 4:10
"These Days" – 3:36
"Lightnin' Hopkins" – 3:43
"Welcome to the Occupation" – 2:52
"Driver 8" – 3:35
"Feeling Gravitys Pull" – 5:31
"I Believe" – 4:32
"The One I Love" – 4:20
"Exhuming McCarthy" – 3:23
"Wolves, Lower" – 4:23
"Fall On Me" – 3:05
"Just a Touch" – 3:04
"Oddfellows Local 151" – 5:01
"Little America" – 2:50
"It's the End of the World as We Know It (And I Feel Fine)" – 4:01
"Begin the Begin" – 3:58
"Disturbance at the Heron House" – 3:42
"Moral Kiosk" – 3:02
"Life and How to Live It" – 6:28
Previously released on the 2006 compilation And I Feel Fine... The Best of the I.R.S. Years 1982–1987.
"So. Central Rain" – 5:19
Previously released on the B-Side of the 1988 "Finest Worksong" single as part of the song called "Time After Time, Etc.", of which it comprises the final 5:19.

Personnel

R.E.M.
Bill Berry – drums, backing vocals
Peter Buck – guitar, dulcimer on "King of Birds"
Mike Mills – bass guitar, keyboards, backing vocals
Michael Stipe – lead vocals

Additional musicians
Steve Berlin – horns on "Fireplace"
Carl Marsh – Fairlight CMI synthesizer on "Fireplace"

Production

Bill Berry – production
Peter Buck – production
Mike Mills – production
Michael Stipe – production
Scott Litt – production
Steve Catania – engineering
Tom Der – engineering
Toni Greene – engineering
Gary Laney – engineering
Ted Pattison – engineering
Todd Scholar – engineering
Bob Ludwig – mastering at Masterdisk, New York City, New York, United States; remastered at Gateway Mastering, Portland, Maine, United States in June 1999
Elliot Scheiner – mixing on 2005 re-release
Jim McKay – photography
Michael Meister – photography
Sandra-Lee Phipps – photography
Ron Scarselli – packaging

Chart performance

Weekly charts

Singles

Certifications and sales

Release history

Notes
†I.R.S. Vintage Years edition, with bonus tracks
‡Compact Disc remastered edition
•DualDisc remastered edition
†† 25th anniversary edition, with bonus disc
A truncated edition of Document was also issued on Armed Forces Radio—catalogue number P-24576—with "Finest Worksong", "Welcome to the Occupation", "Fireplace", "Lightnin' Hopkins", and "King of Birds" on one side and tracks from Pink Floyd's A Momentary Lapse of Reason on the other.

References

External links
R.E.M.HQ on Document
 (I.R.S. Vintage Years edition)
 (DualDisc edition)

1987 albums
Albums produced by Bill Berry
Albums produced by Michael Stipe
Albums produced by Mike Mills
Albums produced by Peter Buck
Albums produced by Scott Litt
I.R.S. Records albums
R.E.M. albums
Reagan Era